The Dodge Attitude is a badge-engineered subcompact sedan sold by Stellantis North America (previously Fiat Chrysler Automobiles, Chrysler Group LLC, and Dodge Chrysler LLC) in Mexico over three generations since 2006.

Overview 

The Attitude was commercialised exclusively in the Mexican market, when the local subsidiary of Chrysler rebadged the Hyundai Accent (MC) for the original version using the "Dodge" brand. The model line was updated in 2011 with the Accent RB series.

Mitsubishi Motors became the source of the Dodge Attitude from January 2015, using the Mitsubishi Attrage/Mirage G4 as the donor car.

References

External links

 

Attitude
Cars introduced in 2006
Sedans
Subcompact cars